The 2014 Indian general election polls in Arunachal Pradesh for 2 Lok Sabha seats will be held in a single phase on 9 April 2014.

The main political parties in Arunachal Pradesh are Indian National Congress (INC), Bharatiya Janata Party (BJP), All India Trinamool Congress (AITC), Nationalist Congress Party (NCP) and others.

Opinion poll

Election schedule

Constituency wise Election schedule are given below –

Results
The results of the elections will be declared on 16 May 2014.

References

Indian general elections in Arunachal Pradesh
2010s in Arunachal Pradesh
Arunachal